Genovevo is a masculine given name of Spanish-language origin. It may refer to:

Genovevo de la O (1876–1952), general in the Mexican Revolution
Genovevo Morejón (born 1954), Cuban hammer thrower
Genovevo Rivas Guillén (1886–1947), Mexican general and provisional governor

Spanish masculine given names